Anthony Blake may refer to:

Anthony Blake (bishop), Archbishop of Armagh, 1758–1786
Anthony Richard Blake (died 1849), Irish lawyer, administrator and 'backstairs Viceroy of Ireland'
The protagonist of The Magician, who was played by Bill Bixby
Anthony Blake, Baronet, of the Blake baronets
Anthony Blake, Glennfiddich Award-winning food photographer

See also
Blake (surname)
Tony Blake (disambiguation)